Helina confinis  is a fly from the family Muscidae. It is found in the Palearctic .

References

Muscidae
Diptera of Europe
Insects described in 1825
Taxa named by Carl Fredrik Fallén